Mongol incursions in the Holy Roman Empire took place in the spring of 1241 and again in the winter of 1241–42. They were part of the first Mongol invasion of Europe.

The Mongols did not advance far into the Holy Roman Empire and there was no major clash of arms on its territory. Rather, the army that had invaded Poland, after harassing eastern Germany, crossed the March of Moravia in April–May 1241 to rejoin the army that had invaded Hungary. During their transit, they laid waste the Moravian countryside but avoided strongholds. King Wenceslaus I of Bohemia was joined by some German princes, but he monitored the Mongols in Moravia without seeking battle. There were more significant skirmishes in the north of the Duchy of Austria a month later that left several hundred dead, but there was no cooperation between the Austrians and Hungarians.

In response to the Mongol threat, the imperial church and the imperial princes held assemblies to organize a military response. Pope Gregory IX ordered the preaching of a crusade and from Italy Emperor Frederick II issued an encyclical to that end. A crusading army under the command of King Conrad IV of Germany mustered on 1 July 1241, but was disbanded a few weeks after setting out because the danger had passed.

Although there was no major military action in the Empire, rumours that the Mongols had been checked there spread far beyond the Empire's borders. There are records in several languages from Spain to Armenia of the Bohemian or German king defeating the Mongols and forcing their retreat. In Moravia, a supposed victory over the Mongols took on legendary proportions. In Germany, some contemporary writers attributed the Mongols' general retreat from Europe to the intimidating crusading army. In reality, the Mongols likely spared most of Germany because their primary objective was to punish the Hungarian king for supporting the Cumans.

The Mongols raided eastern Austria and southern Moravia again in December 1241 and January 1242. A century later in 1340 they raided the March of Brandenburg. Anti-Mongol crusades were preached within the Empire's borders several times between these two raids, and even as late as 1351.

Background

The general view in western Europe, since at least 1236, was that the Mongols' ultimate goal was the Holy Roman Empire. This was based partially on intelligence, but mainly on prevailing interpretations of apocalyptic literature. The arrival of the Mongols on the eastern border of the Empire presented the first serious external threat it had faced since the Hungarian invasions in the 10th century. The Empire was not well positioned to meet it. The emperor had been excommunicated since 1239 and the pope was arranging a political crusade against him in Italy.

In 1237, King Béla IV of Hungary received a Mongol ultimatum demanding his submission. According to Aubry of Trois-Fontaines, a similar ultimatum was received at the court of Emperor Frederick II in 1238, although this is not recorded by anyone else and no such document has survived. Frederick supposedly responded that he would gladly resign his crown if he could become the khan's falconer. The Annales Sancrucenses record that the Mongols also sent ambassadors to Duke Frederick II of Austria demanding his submission.

In his Chronica majora, Matthew of Paris records that rumours about the Mongols had spread into the empire by 1238, for which reason the fishmongers of Frisia were unwilling to go to England. He also records that already in 1240 the emperor had sent a letter to King Henry III of England, his brother-in-law, informing him of the Mongol threat. Matthew is also the source for the rumour that the Mongols were the Lost Tribes of Israel and were assisted by Jews smuggling arms out of Germany in wine barrels. The Jewish merchants were said to claim that the barrels were filled with poisoned wine for the invaders. Owing to these rumours, Jews were killed at several customs posts.

The Mongols entered Hungary on 12 March 1241. Béla IV immediately sent a letter requesting assistance to Duke Frederick. The duke arrived in Pest in the last weeks of March or the first week of April with a small contingent of poorly armed men. Frederick quickly won a small victory, killing two spies attached to the contingent under Shiban. Soon after the Cuman leader Köten was killed. Although the role of Frederick in this is uncertain, he left Pest not long after on bad terms with the Hungarian king.

Following the Battle of Mohi on 11 April 1241, the defeated king of Hungary fled to Austria, crossing the border at Pressburg. Initially welcomed by his erstwhile ally, Duke Frederick lured the king into the castle of Hainburg and extorted the repayment of an indemnity he had been forced to pay the king six years earlier. Béla handed over all the wealth he had with him, including the crown jewels, and was still forced to pawn three counties to the duke. These were probably the three westernmost counties of Moson, Sopron and Vas, which had large German populations. After he was freed, Béla headed for Croatia. At the same time, Béla sent a letter to King Louis IX of France requesting help and another to the Emperor Frederick offering to submit Hungary to the Empire in exchange for military support. The emperor responded in a letter that he could not assist until his quarrel with the pope was resolved and directed the Hungarian king to request aid from Conrad IV, who had formally been ruling Germany since 1237.

Incursions

Northeastern Germany
As early as 10 March, Henry Raspe, Landgrave of Thuringia, wrote to Duke Henry II of Brabant detailing the Mongols' movements across the border in Poland. After the Battle of Chmielnik on 18 March 1241, the Polish duke Bolesław V fled to Moravia. Following their victory over Duke Henry of Silesia and the Teutonic Knights in the Battle of Legnica on 9 April 1241, Mongol detachments entered the marches of Meissen and Lusatia in eastern Germany, advancing as far as the Elbe. Their attacks are recorded in the Annales sancti Pantaleonis.

King Wenceslaus of Bohemia, who had raised an army of 40,000, retreated into Germany to join his forces with Thuringian and Saxon reinforcements. He avoided giving battle, but had ordered the fortification of his major cities, including Prague. According to a letter from Bartholomew of Trent to Bishop Egino of Brixen, the Mongols "attacked the borders of Bohemia and Saxony". A letter from the master of the French Templars to the French king at about this time noted that if the armies of Bohemia and Hungary "should be defeated, these Tartars will find no one to stand against them as far as" France.

In response to the Mongol threat, German church leaders held several councils in April 1241, issuing calls for a crusade against the Mongols and enjoining fasting and processions for the defence of Germany and Bohemia. A princely assembly was held at Merseburg on 22 April to raise troops and coordinate efforts, according to the Sächsische Weltchronik and the Annales breves Wormatienses. There is no record of who attended, but Duke Albert of Saxony and Bishop Conrad of Meissen had mustered an army and joined Wenceslaus at Königstein by 7 May. In late April, another assembly was held at Herford (or perhaps Erfurt) under the presidency of Archbishop Siegfried of Mainz, then acting regent in Germany, but it did not lead to the formation of an army.

The Mongols did not continue their westward advance into Germany, but turned back east. They did not enter Bohemia. At the Moravian Gate, they turned south and passed between the ranges of the Sudetes and Carpathians, entering Moravia near Opava.

Moravia

The Mongol army at Legnica had been under the command of Orda, Baidar and Qadan. It has been estimated at about 8,000 strong. The army as it entered Moravia must have been somewhat smaller. Uriyangkhadai, the son of Subutai, was also at Legnica. According to the Chinese History of Yuan, the official history of the Mongol Yuan dynasty, Uriyangkhadai took part in the invasion of Poland and the land of the Nie-mi-sz', which word is derived from a name for Germans.

The Franciscan vice-minister in Bohemia, Jordan of Giano, who wrote letters from Prague while the Mongols were in Moravia, indicates that they had passed through the Moravian Gate before 9 May. Other sources place Orda in Hungary by late April, so the transit of Moravia seems to have lasted less than a month. The speed of the transit is mentioned by two other sources: Roger of Torre Maggiore remarks on it and the Annales sancti Pantaleonis note with hyperbole that, whereas it should have taken four days, the Mongols crossed Moravia in one day and night. The Mongols probably exited Moravia through the Hrozenkov pass, what Roger of Torre Maggiore calls the Hungarian Gate. The path they took through Moravia is unknown. They rejoined the main force under Batu Khan outside Trenčín in Hungary.

During their transit, the Mongols devastated all of Moravia "except for the castles and fortified places", according to the Annales sancti Pantaleonis. The only evidence relating to a specific place is a charter of 1247 in which Margrave Ottokar gave the city of Opava some privileges because of the damage the Mongols had caused in the region. All the other charters relating to the destruction of towns and monasteries were forged in the 19th century. No archaeological evidence of the brief Mongol presence in Moravia has yet come to light, nor is Moravia mentioned explicitly in any eastern sources. According to Siegfried of Ballhausen, many Moravian refugees appeared in Meissen and Thuringia. Many others fled into the hills, woods and marshes and hid in caves.

Austria
The Mongol raiding parties entered Austria from Hungary in late May or early June. They did not cross the Danube in Austria, but they sacked Korneuburg to its north. The Mongols were probably in Austria as late as July, although already in that month Duke Frederick II was occupying the Hungarian counties that Béla IV had pawned him.

Duke Frederick detailed the situation in Austria in letters to the pope and the emperor. In a letter to Conrad IV dated 13 June 1241, he reports on the damage the Mongols inflicted on Austria and estimates that he killed 300 of them on the banks of the Morava. A week later, in a letter to Bishop Henry of Constance dated 22 June 1241, Frederick revises his estimate of casualties upwards to 700 and puts his own dead at 100. This incursion into Austria is also mentioned in the Annales Garstenses, Annales Zwetlenses and Annales Sancrucenses. The first two annals record that the Mongols left Austria unscathed, while the Sancrucenses assign them many dead.

Matthew of Paris quotes a letter from a certain Ivo of Narbonne, an eyewitness, who credits King Wenceslaus, Duke Frederick, Patriarch Berthold of Aquileia, Duke Bernard of Carinthia, Margrave Herman V of Baden and the "prince of Dalmatia" with the relief of Wiener-Neustadt from a besieging Mongol army that came from Hungary. This claim is implausible but not impossible. The Mongols are not known to have crossed the Danube before the winter of 1241/42. Ivo credits the prince of Dalmatia—possibly Duke Otto II of Merania—with capturing eight of the enemy, including an Englishman who had served the Mongols for years and under interrogation revealed much that was not previously known in the West. It has been suggested that the enemy at Wiener-Neustadt was in fact a band of unruly Cumans who had left Hungary following the death of Köten. More plausible is the account in the Tewkesbury Annals and the Chronique rimée of Philippe Mouskès of a victory over the Mongols by Duke Otto II of Bavaria, which nonetheless probably involved no more than a Mongol raiding party.

In May 1241, with the Mongol still threat on his doorstep, Duke Otto of Bavaria expelled the Papal legate Albert von Behaim from Bavaria in an act of solidarity with Conrad IV and Frederick II amidst their conflict with the Papacy. In late May, Bishop Conrad of Freising wrote to Henry of Constance about the Mongol threat in the Danube valley. He reported that Wenceslaus was avoiding battle with the Mongols because he had been advised to do so by the king of Hungary.

A Mongol army entered western Hungary, eastern Austria and southern Moravia again in late December 1241, as recorded in a letter dated 4 January 1242 from a Benedictine abbot in Vienna, quoted by Matthew of Paris.

Responses

Emperor Frederick's response
The ongoing quarrel between the excommunicated emperor and the pope hampered the imperial response to the arrival of the Mongols on the empire's eastern border. In May 1241, representatives of the emperor and the pope met to negotiate an end to their dispute in order to sustain a common front against the Mongols. The talks came to nothing. In Italy, Filippo da Pistoia, the bishop of Ferrara, circulated a letter he claimed to have received showing that the Emperor Frederick II had sent envoys to the Mongols and was in league with them. The pope's agents spread similar rumours in Germany.

The emperor remained in Italy throughout the crisis. From there, in either May or June, he sent a short list of seven instructions for countering the Mongol threat to Germany. He specifically ordered the use of crossbows, which were regarded as sparking terror in the Mongols, who did not possess the technology. The same advice was repeated a few years later in the Tartar Relation.

On 20 June in Faenza, the emperor issued the Encyclica contra Tartaros, an encyclical letter announcing the fall of Kiev, the invasion of Hungary and the threat to Germany, and requesting each Christian nation to devote its proper quota of men and arms to the defence of Christendom. According to Matthew of Paris's copy of the encyclical, it was addressed to the Catholic nations—France, Spain, Wales, Ireland, England, Swabia, Denmark, Italy, Burgundy, Apulia, Crete, Cyprus, Sicily, Scotland and Norway—each addressed according to its own national stereotype. Richard of San Germano states that copies were sent to all the princes of the West and quotes the start of the letter to the French king. In the encyclical, Frederick indicated he had accepted Hungarian submission.

Conrad IV's anti-Mongol crusade
On the advice of the secular princes, Archbishop Siegfried promulgated instructions for preaching a crusade against the Mongols on 25 April, after the assembly in Herford. Little seems to have come of it. Preaching did take place in the archdioceses of Mainz, Cologne and Trier; the diocese of Constance and that of Augsburg, where Bishop Siboto commissioned the friars to preach; and the city of Strasbourg. According to the Annales sancti Pantaleonis, the crusade was preached throughout all of Germany by the Dominicans and Franciscans.

On 19 May, with the assistance of Siegfried, the 13-year-old Conrad IV held an assembly at Esslingen, where he took the vow of a crusader. His vow committed him only until 11 November 1241, although Béla IV warned him that the Mongols planned to invade Germany at the beginning of winter in 1241–42. At Esslingen, Conrad proclaimed a Landfrieden (territorial peace) for all of Germany so that forces could be concentrated against the Mongols. Bishops solicited donations for the cause throughout Germany.

Conrad IV set 1 July as the date for the army to assemble at Nuremberg. In June, Pope Gregory IX wrote to several bishops in Germany promoting the preaching of the crusade. The abbot of Heiligenkreuz and the prior of the Dominicans in Vienna were also ordered to preach the crusade in their provinces. The Dominicans and Franciscans preached throughout Germany. According to the Annals of Stade, Gregory had received appeals for the full crusade indulgence from the dukes of Austria and Carinthia. On 19 June, referring to the letter he had received from Duke Frederick, he issued a formal indulgence for the defence of Germany and Bohemia, as he had three days earlier for Hungary.

Among those known to have taken a crusader's vow and joined the imperial army are Duke Otto of Brunswick, Archbishop Conrad of Cologne, Count Albert IV of Tyrol, Count Ulrich of Ulten and Count Louis of Helfenstein. The geographical spread of these names suggests that the call for a crusade was widely heeded across Germany. In his letter of 13 June, Duke Frederick explained that he would not join the crusade because he was already engaged with the Mongols, whom he described as a "hurricane". He asked Conrad IV to have crossbows brought to Germany. He also advised him to bring knights from Swabia, Franconia, Bavaria and the Rhineland to Austria and direct the knights of Saxony, Meissen and Thuringia to Bohemia.

The crusader army assembled as planned at Nuremberg and had advanced as far as Weiden by 16 July. It is unclear if Conrad was marching toward Bohemia or Austria. By this time the Mongols were no longer threatening Germany and consequently the crusade broke up. It did not make contact with the Mongols. The latest indication that the crusade was ongoing is a charter issued by the count of Tyrol on 20 July.

According to the Chronicon Wormatiense and the Gesta Treverorum, with the exception of Bishop Landolf of Worms, the bishops and princes divided the money collected for the crusade between themselves. The rebellion of Conrad's regent in Germany, Siegfried of Mainz, who defected to the papal party, was probably the immediate cause of Conrad's decision to end the crusade. Although the crusade had not met the Mongols in battle, the Annales sancti Trudperti, followed by the Annales Zwifaltenses, attributes the Mongols' subsequent retreat from Europe to the intimidating German army. Nationalist modern historians in Germany or Austria have also fallen on such explanations. In reality, the Mongols probably did not invade Germany in force because their objective was merely to punish the Hungarian king for giving protection to the Cumans.

Reports of victory

Despite the lack of contemporary evidence for a major German victory over the Mongols, the rumour that they had received such a check spread as far as Egypt, Armenia and Muslim Spain. It is recorded in the History of the Patriarchs of Alexandria and the Chronological History of Mekhitar of Ayrivank. The Flor des estoires de la terre d'Orient of Hayton of Corycus states that the duke of Austria and the king of Bohemia defeated the Mongols on the Danube and Batu drowned. The Liber secretorum fidelium crucis of Marino Sanudo the Elder also alludes to an Austrian victory on the Danube. The Kitāb al-jughrāfiyya of Ibn Saʿīd al-Maghribī records that a joint German–Hungarian army defeated the Mongols near Šibenik. Matthew of Paris claims that Conrad IV and his brother, King Enzo of Sardinia, defeated a Mongol army on the banks of the river Delpheos (possibly the Dnieper).

In later Moravian historiography, the Mongol invasion of 1241 was conflated with the Hungarian invasion of 1253, which was part of the War of the Babenberg Succession. On the latter occasion, the Hungarian army included pagan Cumans, who were confused with Mongols. The Hungarians besieged Olomouc. They defeated a relief army before lifting the siege. The actual lord of Sternberg Castle at the time was Zdeslav, whose son Yaroslav was probably too young to participate in military action. In the History of the Kingdom of Bohemia of Johannes Dubravius (1552), the siege of Olomouc is moved to 1241 and attributed to the Mongols. Later historians combined these accounts and transformed Yaroslav of Sternberg into a national hero who defeated the Mongols before Olomouc and killed Baidar. In fact, Baidar was still alive in 1246.

Later crusades
Pope Innocent IV called for a crusade against the Mongols to be preached in Germany in August 1243 and throughout Bohemia and Moravia in the spring of 1253. In June 1258, Pope Alexander IV called for another crusade to be preached in Germany, Bohemia and Moravia. In June 1265, Clement IV, in response to a report he received from Béla IV, ordered the preaching of a new crusade against the Mongols in Austria, Bohemia, Brandenburg, Carinthia and Styria within the Holy Roman Empire.

The crusade against the Mongols was rarely promoted thereafter. In 1288, Nicholas IV ordered it preached in Bohemia. John of Winterthur reports attacks on the March of Brandenburg during the Mongol invasion of Poland in 1340. It was also rumoured at that time that the Mongols intended to attack Bohemia, according to the Historia Parmensis of John of Cornazzano. According to Francis of Prague, the Emperor Louis IV refused to aid Poland, but Galvano Fiamma says that "numerous Germans" joined the defence of Poland, as did the king of Bohemia, John the Blind. Benedict XII, responding to a request from King Casimir III of Poland, ordered the crusade preached in Bohemia in 1340. In March 1351, Clement VI authorised Polish clergy to preach the crusade against the Mongols in Bohemia for the defence of Poland.

Notes

References

Sources

Further reading 

Holy Roman Empire
Invasions of the Holy Roman Empire
1241 in Europe
1241 in the Mongol Empire
Conflicts in 1241
13th century in Austria
History of Moravia